Douglas "Doug" James Hilton  (born 13 June 1964 in England) is an Australian molecular biologist. He is the Director of the Walter and Eliza Hall Institute of Medical Research in Melbourne, Australia and Head of the Department of Medical Biology at the University of Melbourne. His research has focused on cytokines, signal transduction pathways and the regulation of blood cell formation (hematopoiesis). Since 2014, Hilton has been the President of the Association of the Australian Medical Research Institutes (AAMRI).

Early life
Hilton migrated to Australia with his family in 1970 and grew up in the Melbourne suburb of Warrandyte. He was educated at Warrandyte Primary School and East Doncaster High School, where he recalls being inspired by “a wonderful biology teacher”.

Scientific career

Education
Hilton received a Bachelor of Science from Monash University. He spent summer holidays as an undergraduate researcher in the laboratory of Ian Young at the John Curtin School of Medical Research. His Honours and PhD research projects were conducted with Professors Don Metcalf and Nicos Nicola at the Walter and Eliza Hall Institute, and resulted in the cloning of the cytokine Leukemia Inhibitory Factor (LIF).

Cytokine Signalling and Blood Cell Formation
Hilton spent two years as a postdoctoral fellow studying the erythropoietin (EPO) receptor with Professor Harvey Lodish at the Whitehead Institute, MIT, USA. In 1993 Hilton returned to the Walter and Eliza Hall Institute where he continued his research into cytokine signalling, with discoveries including the interleukin-11 receptor, the interleukin-13 receptor, and the Suppressors of Cytokine Signalling (SOCS) proteins. In recent years, together with Professor Warren Alexander and Dr Benjamin Kile, Hilton has established a new program using large-scale mouse genetics and genomics to identify regulators of blood cell formation, with a view to determining targets for the development of new medicines. He has been the head of the Institute's Division of Molecular Medicine since it began in 2006, and is a professor in the University of Melbourne Faculty of Medicine, Dentistry and Health Science.

Other positions
From 1997 to 2001, Hilton served as Director of the Cooperative Research Centre (CRC) for Cellular Growth Factors, during which he initiated the Australian Undergraduate Research Opportunity Program (UROP). He is also a co-founder and Chief Scientific Officer of the biotechnology company MuriGen Therapeutics. He currently serves on the Board of the Victorian Comprehensive Cancer Centre, the Australian Cancer Research Foundation Medical Research Advisory Committee, the Victorian Cancer Agency Plan Implementation Committee, the Victorian Life Sciences Computational Initiative Steering Committee, the Board of the Bio21 Cluster, and the Board of the National Center for Genetic Engineering and Biotechnology, Thailand.

Directorship of the Walter and Eliza Hall Institute
On 1 July 2009, Hilton became the sixth Director of the Walter and Eliza Hall Institute.

At the time of appointment, Hilton believed that the Institute's success requires:
continuing its cornerstone research into cancer, blood cells, immunology, autoimmunity and infectious diseases, and enhancing this research with technological and investigative innovations including structural biology, chemistry, high-throughput screening, and mathematics and computational science.
expanding the translational research conducted by the Institute and considering, in collaboration with indigenous communities and other organisations, ways in which the research strengths of the Institute can be constructively utilised to improve indigenous health in Australia.
enhancing the institute's links with the University of Melbourne, the Royal Melbourne Hospital and other leading centres of excellence in medical research and education, and continuing to pursue collaborations with the private sector.

Awards and honours
1989 — Victorian Young Achiever of the Year
1993 — Queen Elizabeth II Postdoctoral Fellowship
1998 — Gottschalk Medal, Australian Academy of Science
1999 — Australian Institute of Political Science, Victorian "Tall Poppy" Award
2000 — Amgen Medical Researcher Award, Australian Society for Medical Research
2000 — Inaugural Commonwealth Health Minister's Award for Excellence in Health and Medical Research
2003 — The GlaxoSmithKline Australia Award for Research Excellence
2004 — Fellow of the Australian Academy of Science
2006 — COSMOS Bright Spark Award "Australia's Top 10 Scientific Minds Under 45"
2008 — Australia National Health and Medical Research Council “Ten great minds in health and medical research”
2009 — The Age Melbourne Magazine, “Top 100 People”
2010 — Fellow of the Australian Academy of Technological Sciences and Engineering
2011 — Seymour & Vivian Milstein Award for Excellence in Interferon and Cytokine Research, International Cytokine Society and the International Society for Interferon and Cytokine Research
2011 — Research Australia Leadership and Innovation Award
2012 — Lemberg Medal, Australian Society of Biochemistry and Molecular Biology
2012 — Eureka Prize for Outstanding Mentor of Young Researchers
2013 — Ramaciotti Medal for Excellence in Biomedical Research 
2015 — Fellow of the Australian Academy of Health and Medical Sciences
 2016 — Officer in the Order of Australia for distinguished service to medical research and education, particularly in the field of haematology, as a molecular biologist and author, to gender equity, and as a mentor of young scientists.

References

External links
 Doug Hilton Faculty page,Walter and Eliza Hall Institute
 MuriGen Therapeutics
 

Australian medical researchers
Australian molecular biologists
Fellows of the Australian Academy of Science
WEHI alumni
Living people
1964 births
Officers of the Order of Australia
Fellows of the Australian Academy of Health and Medical Sciences
WEHI staff
People from Warrandyte, Victoria
Academic staff of the University of Melbourne
People from Eton, Berkshire
Scientists from Melbourne
English emigrants to Australia
20th-century Australian scientists
21st-century Australian scientists
Monash University alumni
Australian National University alumni